The miraculous catch of fish, or more traditionally the miraculous draught of fish(es), is either of two events commonly (but not universally) considered to be miracles in the canonical gospels. The miracles are reported as taking place years apart from each other, but in both miracles apostles are fishing unsuccessfully in the Sea of Galilee when Jesus tells them to try one more cast of the net, at which they are rewarded with a great catch (or "draught", as in "haul" or "weight"). Either is thus sometimes called a "miraculous draught of fish".

Overview
In the Gospel of Luke, the first miraculous catch of fish takes place early in the ministry of Jesus and results in Peter as well as James and John, the sons of Zebedee, joining Jesus vocationally as disciples.

The second miraculous catch of fish is also called the "miraculous catch of 153 fish", and seems to recall the first catch. It is reported in the last chapter of the Gospel of John and takes place after the Resurrection of Jesus.

In Christian art, the two miracles are distinguished by the fact that in the first miracle Jesus is shown sitting in the boat with Peter, while in the second miracle he is standing on the shore.

First miraculous catch of fish
According to the Gospel of Luke, on the day of this miracle, Jesus was preaching near the Lake of Genesareth (Sea of Galilee), when he saw two boats at the water's edge.  Boarding the one belonging to Simon (Peter), and moving out a little from shore, he sat and taught the people from the boat. Afterwards, he said to Peter:

Peter answered:

When they had done so, "they caught such a large number of fish that their nets began to break", requiring help from another boat. When Peter saw the large catch, which filled both boats almost to sinking point, he fell at Jesus' knees and said, "Go away from me, Lord; I am a sinful man!" Jesus responded "Don't be afraid; from now on you will catch men", after which Peter and his partners James and John left everything and followed Jesus.

Second miraculous catch of fish—153 large ones 

According to John 21:11

This has become known popularly as the "153 fish" miracle. In the Gospel of John, seven of the disciples—Peter, Thomas, Nathanael, the sons of Zebedee (James and John), and two others – decided to go fishing one evening after the Resurrection of Jesus, but caught nothing that night. Early the next morning, Jesus (whom they had not recognised) called out to them from the shore:

When they reply in the negative (the question in Greek uses a particle which expects the answer "No"), Jesus responds: "Throw your net on the right side of the boat and you will find some".  After doing so, "they were unable to haul the net in because of the large number of fish".

Realising the identity of their advisor, the disciple whom Jesus loved said to Peter, "It is the Lord!" at which Peter jumped into the water to meet him (an aspect of the story often illustrated in Christian art), while the remaining disciples followed in the boat, towing the net, which proved to be full of 153 large fish.

This passage has traditionally been one of the liturgical readings following Easter, and sermons have been preached on it by Augustine of Hippo and John Chrysostom, among others.

153 fish
The precision of the number of fish as 153 has long been considered, and various writers have argued that the number 153 has some deeper significance, with many conflicting theories having been offered (see the discussion on the number 153 in the Bible). For instance, Augustine of Hippo argued that the significance lay in the fact that 153 is the sum of the first 17 integers (i.e. 153 is the 17th triangular number), with 17 representing the combination of divine grace (the seven gifts of the Holy Spirit) and law (the Ten Commandments).

Discussing some of these theories, theologian D. A. Carson suggests that "If the Evangelist has some symbolism in mind connected with the number 153, he has hidden it well", while other scholars note "No symbolic significance for the number of 153 fish in John 21:11 has received widespread support".

References to aspects of the miracle, or to the general idea of being "fishers of men", can sometimes be recognised by uses of the number 153.  For example, St Paul's School in London was founded in 1512 by John Colet to teach 153 poor men's children: although the school is now considerably larger, it still has 153 Foundation Scholars, who since the 19th century have worn a fish emblem on their watch-chains, or, more recently, in their button-holes.

2 Chronicles 2:17 records Solomon as having conducted a census of foreigners: "And Solomon numbered all the strangers that were in the land of Israel, after the numbering wherewith David his father had numbered them; and they were found an hundred and fifty thousand and three thousand and six hundred."

Interpretations

Friedrich Justus Knecht: a parable of the Church 
The Catholic German theologian Friedrich Justus Knecht (d. 1921) wrote that,
The object of this miracle which Jesus worked solely for Peter and the other disciples was twofold: 1. Like all the other miracles it was meant to increase and confirm the faith of the disciples; 2. it was meant to prepare the disciples, and especially St. Peter, for the apostolic office, which was typified by this miracle. Through it Jesus meant to say to His disciples: “Even as just now you put out to sea and cast in your nets, at my bidding, and captured this extraordinary draught, so in the future shall you fish for the souls of men in the sea of this world; and you will have as great a success in that office as you have had just now with your nets, and will bring thousands of souls into the kingdom of God, i. e. the Church.” Thus the miraculous draught of fish typifies the apostolic work of the Church of Jesus Christ. The sea is the world; the fish are the men living in the world. The bark is the Church; the helmsman is Peter (and his successors). He steers the bark, and with the help of his companions (the Apostles, and after them the Bishops), casts his net by preaching the doctrine of Christ, and by holy Baptism receives into the Church those who will believe.

Gallery of art

See also
 Chronology of Jesus
 Life of Jesus in the New Testament
 Ministry of Jesus
 Miracles of Jesus
 Parables of Jesus
 Restoration of Peter
 Our Lady of Aparecida
 Jesus preaches in a ship

Further reading

References 

History of fishing
Miracles of Jesus
Fish in Christianity
Animals in the Bible
Sea of Galilee